The George Washington University Student Association (known as the GW Student Association or SA) is the student government of the George Washington University in Washington, DC. The SA is responsible for advocacy on behalf of the GW student body at and is modeled after the U.S. Federal Government and consists of three branches: legislative, executive and judicial.

The origins of GW's Student Association trace back to 1909, but the current structure dates to 24 May 1976, when the current constitution was adopted by a university-wide referendum, which established the Executive Cabinet, the Senate, and the Student Court. Numerous alumni of GW's student government have gone on to pursue prominent careers in politics, such as Edward David Burt (youngest ever Premier of Bermuda), in diplomacy, such as Ambassador Edward Gnehm (Presidential Distinguished Award winner), and in the private sector, such as Neil Portnow (former president of The Recording Academy).

History
In 1909, a student representational system governed by various class presidents or officers was founded.

In 1930, the previous system was abolished in favor of the creation of the GW Student Council. All schools in 1930 were to receive one representative for every 500 students. In 1938 the constitution was changed. The new Council was composed of 9 members elected of the student body at large and 5 members from various student groups. It was given the following powers: 1) to make rules governing elections, 2) to classify activities as "major" or "minor," 3) to require major activities to file prospect covering their programs for each year, 4) to prescribe systems of accounts and records for any activity, and, 5) to make rules providing appropriate penalties for violation of any rule, regulation, or order of the Council.

The Council system, with modifications (it later became known as the Student Assembly), continued until February 27, 1970, when 69% of the student body voted in a referendum to dissolve the student government.

Student Assembly president Neil Portnow ran for reelection with the abolition of the Assembly as the major plank of his platform. He won, and on February 17 read a statement to The GW Hatchet and other press announcing the abolition of GW's student government.

It wasn't until 1974 that a referendum to bring back some form of student government was initiated, and in January 1975 students voted to create a new governing system by a five to one margin. The George Washington University Student Association came into being in April 1976 when students ratified a new constitution by a vote of 1,343 to 241. On May 24 of that year the Board of Trustees ratified the Student Association charter. Membership included all full-time, part-time, graduate, professional and undergraduate students who were registered for academic credit. Today, the Student Association is made up of the executive, senate and judicial branches.

Starting in 2010 the SA focused on reducing printing fees after charges were leveled that the University was profiting off of students. After having little success the issue was again taken up in 2011 with the formation of a joint committee of students and faculty after stonewalling from the university administration. Second semester of the 2011-2012 academic year there was again another vow to renew the fight against student fees. Eventually, the fee was reduced.

Other advocacy efforts have included the restoration of free news papers to student after they were cut by the University. There was also a push to ban smoking on campus by the Senate that led to a campus wide referendum that passed overwhelmingly, but needs to be enacted by the administration. The Student Association has also successfully lobbied for the installation of condom dispensers in residence halls.

Organization

Executive Cabinet
The Executive Cabinet is the executive branch of the SA. The President and Vice President (VP), elected on separate tickets by the 26,000 graduate and undergraduate students, oversee the Executive Branch, which consists of the Executive Cabinet and several subordinate entities. The President appoints Executive Secretaries who lead their own "departments," such as Diversity, Equity, and Inclusion and Academic Affairs. These Secretaries must receive confirmation from two-thirds of the Senate. Assistant Secretaries are also appointed by the President, and also must receive Senate confirmation, but can be created or eliminated at will.

The Cabinet is typically led by the President and their Chief of Staff. The "Executive Cabinet" is made up of the President, Chief of Staff, Treasurer (chief financial officer), Legislator General (chief legislative officer), and Communications Director.

Senate
The Senate is the SA holds the power to approve bills that are sent to the President, as well as control the Student Association's $1,778,704 budget. The Senate consists of thirty-six Senators representing their respective schools within the university, as well as several appointed at-large undergraduate and graduate Senators. The Senate consists of five standing committees that include the Financial Services and Allocations Committee, Physical Facilities and Urban Affairs Committee, Student Life Committee, Education Policy Committee and Governance and Nominations Committee, a Subcommittee on Sustainability, and the Diversity and Inclusion Assembly, which consists both senators and student leaders. The Senate has the mandate of making recommendations on issues that affect student life, give general direction to Student Association policies, collect a student fee from tuition and subsequent disbursement, and passing of bills as it sees fit among other powers. The current Chairperson Pro Tempore of the SA Senate is Demetrius Apostolis.

Governance and Nominations Committee

The Governance and Nominations Committee shall focus on issues and legislation concerning amendments to the Constitution and these Bylaws, with such amendments pertaining to financial matters jointly shared with the Financial Services and Allocations Committee, screening candidates for all Senate vacancies, working with the Presiding Officer in the operation of the Senate, impeachment, removal, recall, and censure, the allocations appeal process, during which the Chairperson Pro-Tempore shall serve as Chairperson of the Allocation Appeals Committee, general oversight of internal Student Association operations across all three branches of government, and general oversight of all Senate Committees.

Financial Services and Allocations Committee

The Finance Committee is in charge of the funds that the Senate collects from student tuition to fund the Student Association budget, collecting just over $1.7 million. These funds are primarily doled out to the over 500 student organizations on campus at The George Washington University in addition to funding the operational budget of the Student Association. The Committee is responsible for setting criteria for disbursements and working with the Vice President for Financial Affairs, a member of the President's cabinet. In 2012 the Finance Committee put a Student Fee Increase to a student body referendum. The proposal sought to increase the amount the SA collects from students to $3.00 per credit hour from $1.50 per credit hour, boosting the SA budget to an estimated $1.75 million over nine years. The referendum was ratified by the student body with 66% voting in favor.

Student Life Committee
The Student Life Committee is responsible for advocating on issues that affect students. Primarily, the Committee raises these issues at Senate meetings and proposes bills to be used as the basis for advocacy efforts. As of the 2021-2022 academic year, the committee was divided into an undergraduate and graduate assembly.

Education Policy Committee
The Education Policy Committee (formerly Academic Affairs Committee) primarily focuses on issues that relate to students' academics. The Committee works closely with the Faculty Senate and university administration to address relevant issues. As of the 2021-2022 academic year, the committee was renamed the "Education Policy Committee" and divided into an undergraduate and graduate assembly.

Physical Facilities and Urban Affairs Committee
The Committee on Physical Facilities and Urban Affairs shall focus on issues and legislation concerning the Safety and Facilities, such as GWPD, Housing, Campus Buildings, and Events and Venues, Business Services such as GWorld, Dining, Facility Services, FixIt, Safe Ride, Mail Services, and Parking, Student Wellbeing, such as Disability Support Services, Campus Advisories, Lerner Health and Wellness, GW Health Center/Counseling, and The Store; and the general operation of the University. 

Sub-committee on Sustainability
The Permanent Sub-Committee on Sustainability is a sub-committee under the Committee on Physical Facilities and Urban Affairs. The Permanent Subcommittee shall focus on issues and legislation relating to sustainability measures on campus. Legislation can be referred directly to the Subcommittee, which has the power to submit approved legislation to the Full Senate for consideration.

Diversity and Inclusion Assembly
The Diversity and Inclusion Assembly work closely with the Office for Diversity, Equity, and Community Engagement to advocate on behalf of multicultural student groups on campus. The assembly also creates strategic plans to ensure representation and foster multicultural community outreach.

Student Court
The Judicial Branch consists of the Student Court, composed of five members, two of whom must be undergraduate and two graduate students. Members of the Court serve for their entire academic career after being appointed by the President and confirmed by the Senate. The court has jurisdiction over any cases the involve suits brought between parties within the Student Association and between other student organizations suing the Student Association.

Presidential candidate Kyle Boyer won the popular vote, but was charged with a violation of election rules for failing to report the market value of a car used during campaigning. Julie Bindleglass lost the popular vote, but became President of the SA when the Joint Election Committee, active during elections, threw Boyer off the ballot. Boyer then sued the Joint Elections Committee in the Student Court. The Court used a 1992 precedent in which Presidential candidate Christopher Ferguson alleged he was thrown off the ballot in an "arbitrary and capricious manner", criteria for bringing a case to the court, as precedent for hearing the case. The Student Court upheld the disqualification from the ballot and effectively decided the outcome of the election.

List of SA Presidents

References

External links
Official website
Governing Documents

1976 establishments in Washington, D.C.
Colleges and Schools of The George Washington University
Organizations established in 1976
Student governments in the United States